The serum amyloid P component (SAP) is the identical serum form of amyloid P component (AP), a 25kDa pentameric protein first identified as the pentagonal constituent of in vivo pathological deposits called "amyloid".  APCS is its human gene.

In amyloidosis
AP makes up 14% of the dry mass of amyloid deposits and is thought to be an important contributor to the pathogenesis of a related group of diseases called the Amyloidoses. These conditions are characterised by the ordered aggregation of normal globular proteins and peptides into insoluble fibres which disrupt tissue architecture and are associated with cell death. AP is thought to decorate and stabilise aggregates by preventing proteolytic cleavage and hence inhibiting fibril removal via the normal protein scavenging mechanisms. This association is utilised in the routine clinical diagnostic technique of SAP scintigraphy whereby radio-labelled protein is injected into patients to locate areas of amyloid deposition.  The SAP-amyloid association has also been identified as a possible drug target for anti-amyloid therapy, with the recent development and first stage clinical trials of a compound called CPHPC (R-1-[6-[R-2-carboxy-pyrrolidin-1-yl]-6-oxohexanoyl] pyrrolidine-2-carboxylic acid), a small molecule able to strip AP from deposits by reducing levels of circulating SAP.

Structure
SAP is a member of the pentraxins family, characterised by calcium dependent ligand binding and distinctive flattened β-jellyroll structure similar to that of the legume lectins.  The name "pentraxin" is derived from the Greek word for five (penta) and berries (ragos) relating to the radial symmetry of five monomers forming a ring approximately 95 Å across and 35 Å deep.  Human SAP has 51% sequence homology with C-reactive protein (CRP), a classical acute phase response plasma protein, and is a more distant relative to the "long" pentraxins such as PTX3 (a cytokine modulated molecule) and several neuronal pentraxins. Both SAP and CRP are evolutionary conserved in all vertebrates and also found in distant invertebrates such as the horseshoe crab (Limulus polyphemus).

References 

 

Blood proteins
Acute-phase proteins